Lustadt is a municipality in the district of Germersheim, in Rhineland-Palatinate, Germany.

Personalities

Sons and Daughters of the Community 

 Martin Hemmer (1863-1947), Catholic priest and prelate
 Werner Doppler (* 1941), agricultural economist and economist at the University of Hohenheim

People who work or have worked on the ground 

 Jakob Schwalb (1872-1934), priest, temporally Kaplan in Oberlustadt
 Max Seither (1914-2003), politician (SPD), from 1969 mayor of Lustadt

References

Germersheim (district)